Skierbieszów Landscape Park (Skierbieszowski Park Krajobrazowy) is a protected area (Landscape Park) in eastern Poland, established in 1995.

The park lies within Lublin Voivodeship: in Krasnystaw County (Gmina Izbica, Gmina Krasnystaw, Gmina Kraśniczyn) and Zamość County (Gmina Grabowiec, Gmina Miączyn, Gmina Sitno, Gmina Skierbieszów, Gmina Stary Zamość).

Landscape Park contains two nature reserves.

References 

Landscape parks in Poland
Parks in Lublin Voivodeship